The Works is the fourth studio album by the English singer-songwriter and multi-instrumentalist Nik Kershaw. It was released in 1989 and was the last album he created for MCA Records. Kershaw chose the album's title as he felt the album represented "the collected works of Nik Kershaw". He did not release any new solo material until 15 Minutes, 10 years later.

The album was not commercially successful, though the lead single "One Step Ahead" reached No. #55 in the UK. "Elisabeth's Eyes", the second and final single, failed to chart altogether.

Although the album was produced by Peter Wolf and co-produced by Brian Malouf, both singles were written shortly after Kershaw became unhappy with Wolf's production and his direction for the album. They were produced by Kershaw and Julian Mendelsohn, with the two also re-working the production of the entire album, earning them an additional production credit.

After its original release, the album remained out of print on any format for years. However, in November 2006, the album became available via online MP3 download on major sites such as Amazon and iTunes.

Background
In an interview of the time, Kershaw spoke of the album's creation and production: 

Speaking of working with Wolf, Kershaw said: 

The track "One World" was later issued on Kershaw's 1991 compilation album The Collection, while the German vinyl and Japanese CD editions of the compilation featured a re-recorded version of the track instead. In recent years, Kershaw stated via his Q&A sessions "Drum Talk" that the re-recorded version was to be a single after the release of "Elisabeth's Eyes", however this never materialised as he and the record label MCA parted company. In 1991, English pop singer Chesney Hawkes covered the song for his album The One and Only, where it also appeared as B-side to his third single "Secrets of the Heart". In the same year, Hawkes had scored a number one hit in the UK with the Nik Kershaw-penned song "The One and Only".

Track listing
All songs are written by Nik Kershaw except where indicated.

Side one
 "One Step Ahead"  – 3:53
 "Elisabeth's Eyes"  – 4:40
 "Take My Place"  – 4:04
 "Wounded Knee"  – 3:53
 "Cowboys & Indians"  – 3:52

Side two
 "One World" (Nik Kershaw, Peter Wolf) – 4:39
 "Don't Ask Me"  – 4:02
 "Burning at Both Ends"  – 4:05
 "Lady on the Phone" (Kershaw, Wolf)  – 4:09
 "Walkabout"  – 4:56

Personnel
 Nik Kershaw – vocals, guitar, keyboards, programming, arrangements
 Peter Wolf – keyboards, synthesizer, arrangements
 Dave Clayton – keyboards
 Paul "Wix" Wickens – keyboards
 Vinnie Colaiuta – drums
 Paulinho Da Costa – percussion
 Jeff Porcaro – drums on "Walkabout"
 Dan Higgins – tenor, alto and baritone saxophone
 Larry Williams – tenor saxophone
 Gary Grant – trumpet
 Jerry Hey – trumpet
 Charles Loper – trombone
 Gary Maughan – programming
 Ina Wolf, Maxi Anderson, Michael McDonald, Nadirah Ali, Phillip Ingram, Sheri Kershaw, Siedah Garrett – backing vocals

Singles
 "One Step Ahead" UK #55
 B-side – "When I Grow Up"
 "Elisabeth's Eyes"
 B-side – "My Friend John"

References

External links
 

'The Works' lyrics: http://www.kershaw.net/lyrics/works.html

Nik Kershaw albums
1989 albums
MCA Records albums
Albums produced by Julian Mendelsohn
Albums produced by Peter Wolf